Helen is a census-designated place (CDP) in Raleigh County, West Virginia, United States. As of the 2010 census, its population was 219. West Virginia Route 16, Winding Gulf and railroad tracks run right through the community.

The Helen mine and coal camp was opened in the 1910s by the East Gulf Coal Company. Many years later, the mine was operated by the Koppers Coal company, which then became the Eastern Gas & Fuel - Coal Division, and even later Eastern Associated Coal Company. Eastern Associated operated the Helen mine into the 1980s.

Today, Helen remains a small, unincorporated area in southern West Virginia. There is a Baptist church there.

References

Census-designated places in Raleigh County, West Virginia
Census-designated places in West Virginia
Coal towns in West Virginia